The 2007 IRB Pacific Nations Cup was a rugby union competition held between six Pacific Rim sides; Australia A, Fiji, Japan, Samoa, Tonga and the Junior All Blacks (New Zealand's second XV). This was the first year that Australia A had competed – Australia had declined the invitation to compete in the inaugural competition in 2006 because they wanted to focus on their domestic competition, but on 18 October 2006 it was announced that they would send their second XV. For this reason, the inaugural tournament was renamed the Pacific Nations Cup instead of the IRB Pacific Five Nations as it had been called in 2006.

The tournament was a round-robin of 15 games where each team played one match against each of the others. There are four points for a win, two points for a draw and none for a defeat. There are also bonus points offered with one bonus point for scoring four or more tries in a match and one bonus point for losing by 7 points or less.

New Zealand's Junior All Blacks won the Cup for the second time in Round 4, gaining an unbeatable lead after beating Australia A 50–0 in Dunedin.

Table

Results

Round 1

Round 2

Round 3

Round 4

Round 5

Top scorers

Top points scorers

Source: irb.com

Top try scorers

Source: irb.com

See also 

2007 IRB Nations Cup
Pacific Tri-Nations

References and notes

2007
2007 rugby union tournaments for national teams
2007 in Australian rugby union
2007 in Fijian rugby union
2007 in Samoan rugby union
2007 in Tongan rugby union
2007 in New Zealand rugby union
2006–07 in Japanese rugby union
2007 in Oceanian rugby union